Suite for Pops is a 1975 big band jazz album recorded by the Thad Jones/Mel Lewis Jazz Orchestra and released on the A&M Horizon label.

Track listing
LP side A:
 "Meetin' Place"
 "The Summary"
 "The Farewell"
 "Toledo By Candlelight"
LP side B:
 "The Great One"
 "Only For Now"
 "A Good Time Was Had By All"

Personnel
 Thad Jones – trumpet, flugelhorn, percussion
 Mel Lewis – drums
 Roland Hanna – piano
 Richard Davis – double bass
 George Mraz - double bass
 Steve Gilmore - double bass
 Jerry Dodgion – soprano & alto saxophone, flute
 Eddie Xiques – alto saxophone, clarinet, bass clarinet, flute
 Billy Harper – tenor saxophone, flute
 Eddie Daniels – tenor saxophone, clarinet, flute
 Ron Bridgewater - tenor saxophone, clarinet, flute
 Frank Foster - tenor saxophone, clarinet
 Greg Herbert - tenor saxophone
 Lou Marini - tenor saxophone
 Pepper Adams – baritone saxophone, clarinet
 Jon Faddis – trumpet, percussion
 Stephen Furtado - trumpet
 Jim Bossy - trumpet
 Lew Soloff - trumpet
 Snooky Young – trumpet
 Marvin Stamm – trumpet
 Virgil Jones – trumpet
 Cecil Bridgewater – trumpet
 Jimmy Knepper – trombone
 Quentin Jackson – trombone
 Eddie Bert – trombone
 Janice Robinson - trombone
 Earl McIntyre - trombone
 Cliff Heather - bass trombone
 Jack Jeffers – bass trombone/tuba
 Dave Taylor - bass trombone
 Jim Buffington – French horn
 Peter Gordon - French horn
 Earl Chapin - French horn
 Julius Watkins - French horn
 Ray Alonge – French horn
 Leonard Gibbs - percussion
 Dee Dee Bridgewater – vocal

References and external links

 A&M Horizon SP-701
 Suite for Pops at:
 [ Allmusic]
 discogs.com

The Thad Jones/Mel Lewis Orchestra albums
1975 albums
Horizon Records albums